Pyrgocythara urceolata is a species of sea snail, a marine gastropod mollusk in the family Mangeliidae.

Description
The length of the shell attains 7 mm.

Distribution
This species occurs in the Atlantic Ocean off the Cape Verdes and Angola.

References

 Rolan, E. & J. Otero-Schmitt 1999. Argonauta, 13(1): 5–26, figs. 79–82
 Rolán E., 2005. Malacological Fauna From The Cape Verde Archipelago. Part 1, Polyplacophora and Gastropoda

External links
 American Museum of Natural History: Pyrgocythara urceolata
 

urceolata
Gastropods described in 1999
Molluscs of the Atlantic Ocean
Molluscs of Angola
Gastropods of Cape Verde